Sejus is a genus of mites in the family Sejidae. There are about 17 described species in Sejus.

Species
These 17 species belong to the genus Sejus:

 Sejus americanus Banks, 1902
 Sejus australis Hirschmann & Kaczmarek, 1991
 Sejus boliviensis Hirschmann & Kaczwarek, 1991
 Sejus camerunis Wisniewski & Hirschmann, 1991
 Sejus carolinensis
 Sejus cascadensis De Leon, 1964
 Sejus congoensis Wisniewski & Hirschmann, 1991
 Sejus longipes (Willmann, 1951)
 Sejus novaezealandiae Fain & Galloway, 1993
 Sejus posnaniensis Hirschmann & Kaczwarek
 Sejus sanborni Packard
 Sejus scimitus
 Sejus solaris Wisniewski & Hirschmann, 1991
 Sejus stebaevi Wisniewski & Hirschmann, 1991
 Sejus tennesseensis De Leon, 1964
 Sejus togatus C.L.Koch, 1836
 † Sejus bdelloides Koch & Berendt, 1854

References

Acari
Articles created by Qbugbot